Ariah (Aryeh) Lev Mohiliver (Mohilever) (born May 16, 1904, Białystok; died March 7, 1996, in Jerusalem) was an Israeli chess master and editor.

Born in Poland, he emigrated to Palestine (British Mandate) in 1920. Mohiliver was one of the country’s strongest players at the time, who was among the founders in 1922 of the first Jewish chess club in Palestine: the Emanuel Lasker Club in Beit Haam. He published two chess problems in the Egyptian Post in 1921 and then in Palestine Post, he was the chess columnist in a daily newspaper (Doar Hayom)<ref>{{Cite web|url=https://www.chess.org.il/ContentPages/ContentPage.aspx?Id=522|title = דר אריה ליב מוהילבר, אתר האיגוד הישראלי לשחמט}}</ref>  and edited a chess magazine, Ha’shachmat'', in Palestine in 1922-1924. He was still active in 1992, publishing, among others, a note on the 70th anniversary of Jerusalem's Rubinstein Chess Club.

Mohilever died in 1996 in Jerusalem, at the age of 91.

References

1904 births
Chess composers
20th-century Polish Jews
Polish chess players
Israeli chess players
Jewish chess players
Polish emigrants to Mandatory Palestine
Israeli chess writers
Year of death missing
Sportspeople from Białystok